These are the Billboard magazine Dance/Mix Show Airplay number-one hits of 2023.

See also
2023 in music
List of Billboard Hot Dance/Electronic Songs number ones

References

External links
Current Dance/Mix Show Airplay chart

2023
United States Dance Airplay